Goliad Independent School District is a public school district based in Goliad, Texas (USA). The district's boundaries parallel that of Goliad County. Goliad ISD is composed of one high school, one middle school, one elementary school, and one District Alternative Education Program (DAEP), all sharing the district's name.

In 2009, the school district was rated "academically acceptable" by the Texas Education Agency.

References

External links
 

School districts in Goliad County, Texas